Genevieve is a ghost town in Valley County, Montana, United States, located north of Hinsdale. The only structure is the Genevieve Community Hall, which is still maintained by area residents.

Ghost towns in Montana